The Democratic Party is a political party in Tajikistan founded in August 1990 by Mahmadruzi Iskandarov. Along with the other Tajik opposition parties, it was banned from July 1993 to August 1999.

Under the 30% quota provided by the Peace Agreement that concluded the Tajik Civil War, some party members were appointed to governmental and administrative posts. Iskandarov, who had been party chairman since its resumption in 1999, headed the state gas monopoly Tajikgaz from 2001 to 2003.

The party received no seats in the legislative elections held on 27 February and 13 March 2005, but percentages are not available. The party boycotted the 2006 Presidential election. On 15 April 2005, the party founder Mahmadruzi Iskandarov was taken by Russian security agencies, which has been considered illegal, in the town of Korolyov, and flown to Tajikistan and sentenced there to 23 years in jail. Following this, Saidjafar Usmonzoda was elected as the party's new leader.

References

Political parties in Tajikistan
Formerly banned political parties
Pro-independence parties in the Soviet Union